In Greek mythology, Erodius is the son of Autonous (son of Melaneus) and Hippodamia. He was the brother of Acanthis, Acanthus, Anthus and Schoeneus. He was transformed into a heron by Zeus and Apollo.

Mythology 
Erodius loved horses. One day, Erodius' brother Anthus led the family's mares outside the pasture. The mares went mad, attacked and devoured Anthus as his family watched helplessly, unable to save him. Zeus and Apollo took pity in them and transformed them all into birds. Erodius became a heron, as did the manservant of the family, though it was a different sort of heron.

See also 

 Clinis
 Lycius
 Mares of Diomedes

References

Bibliography 
 Antoninus Liberalis, The Metamorphoses of Antoninus Liberalis translated by Francis Celoria (Routledge 1992). Online version at the Topos Text Project.
 

Metamorphoses into birds in Greek mythology
Deeds of Apollo
Deeds of Zeus